The 2012 Le Samyn des Dames was the first running of the women's Le Samyn, a women's bicycle race in Fayt-le-Franc, Belgium. It was held on 29 February 2012 over a distance of  starting in Frameries and finishing in Dour. It was rated by the UCI as a 1.2 category race. The race was part of the 2012 Lotto Cycling Cup.

The race ended with a bunch sprint.

Results

s.t. = same time
source

References

External links
 Official website 

2012 in women's road cycling
2012 in Belgian sport
Le Samyn des Dames